The art deco Prince Rupert City Hall, in Prince Rupert, British Columbia, was originally constructed as the Federal
Building in 1938.

The architect was Max B. Downing who persuaded the Department of Public Works to use "monolithic concrete" on the edifice instead of brick. 

It was built in the fashionable art deco streamlined style; many years later decorative native motifs were incorporated into the front wall.

It is one of only 2 existing Art Deco city halls in Canada; the other being Vancouver City Hall.

References

Art Deco architecture in Canada
City and town halls in British Columbia
Prince Rupert, British Columbia